Universidad Central de Venezuela Fútbol Club (usually called Universidad Central or UCV FC) is a professional football club based in Caracas and playing in the Venezuelan Primera División. The club was founded in 1950 and has won one First Division title in the professional era.

Titles
Primera División Venezolana: 3
Amateur Era (2): 1951, 1953
Professional Era (1): 1957

Coaches
  Orlando Fantoni (1957)

External links
Official Site 

Association football clubs established in 1950
Football clubs in Venezuela
Football clubs in Caracas
1950 establishments in Venezuela